The Shinkai 6500 (しんかい) is a crewed research submersible that can dive up to a depth of . It was completed in 1990. The Shinkai 6500 is owned and run by the Japan Agency for Marine-Earth Science and Technology (JAMSTEC) and it is launched from the support vessel Yokosuka.

Buoyancy is provided by syntactic foam.

Three  methacrylate resin view ports are arranged at the front and on each side of the vehicle.

A Lego set based on the submersible was created through the Lego Cuusoo website.

References

External links 

 JAMSTEC Shinkai 6500 page
 On June 23, 2013, the world's first live broadcast from 5,000 metres deep was carried out by the Shinkai 6500

Deep-submergence vehicles
Research submarines of Japan
Japan Agency for Marine-Earth Science and Technology
Ships built by Mitsubishi Heavy Industries
1990 ships